Chien Kok-ching (born circa 1934) is a Taiwanese former basketball player. He competed as part of the Republic of China's squad at the 1956 Summer Olympics.

References

External links

1934 births
Living people
Taiwanese men's basketball players
Olympic basketball players of Taiwan
Basketball players at the 1956 Summer Olympics
Malaysian men's basketball players
Republic of China men's national basketball team players